İmralı is a small Turkish prison island in the south of the Sea of Marmara, west of the Armutlu-Bozburun peninsula within Bursa Province. It is prohibited to fly over it or fish near its shores.

History 
The Roman authors Pliny the Elder and Strabo called the island Besbicus. It was later known as Kalonymos and Kalolimnos. In antiquity, it was a member of the Delian League since it appears in tribute records of Athens between 434/3 and 418/7 BCE.

The Turkish name İmralı derives from the name of the island's conqueror, Emir Ali, one of the first Ottoman admirals. In 1308 İmralı became the first island to be conquered by the newly established Ottoman Navy. Its strategic location enabled the Ottomans to control the movement of ships in the Sea of Marmara with a naval base established on it, cutting the Byzantine Empire's connection to Bursa. The island is also referred as "Mir Ali" in Ottoman documents. The island was also a place of refuge for the runaways of the Devshirme System. For example in 1567, a group of runaways was protected and hidden by the locals of Mir Ali Island while the batches of children were being transported from the port of Dutlimanı in Bandırma.

In 1913, the island had 250 houses, a school, three monasteries, and 1,200 residents, all of whom were Greeks. The economic activity of the island's residents consisted mainly of fishing and farming onions, with most of the grown onions sold to Istanbul. There were three Greek villages on the island, engaged mostly in growing grapes, winemaking, silk production and fishing, until the Turkish War of Independence (1919–1923). The island was uninhabited after the 1923 forced population exchange between Greece and Turkey until 1936, when prisoners entered a newly founded semi-open prison facility. The prisoners earned money by working in agriculture and fishing.

One well-known islander was Kimon Friar who emigrated to the United States and became a scholar and translator of Greek language poetry.

There is a military base on the island, and the area around the island is a forbidden zone. It served from 1999 until 2009 as a maximum-security prison island for its only inmate, Abdullah Öcalan the leader of the PKK. The other prisoners on the island were transferred elsewhere on mainland Turkey so that Öcalan was the island's sole prisoner.  In November 2009, several other prisoners were transferred to a newly constructed building on the island, where Öcalan is incarcerated.

References

Sources 

 Brief history 
 On the island
 Brief history
 About the name of the island

Islands of the Sea of Marmara
Islands of Turkey
Prisons in Turkey
Islands of Bursa Province
Prison islands
Members of the Delian League